InstantGo or Modern Standby (formerly Connected Standby) is a Microsoft specification for Windows 8 (and later) hardware and software that aims to bring smartphone-type power management capabilities to the PC platform, as well as increasing physical security.

Description
The specification describes a Microsoft proprietary standard for Windows 8 software and hardware that developers and hardware vendors can optionally comply with to enable devices to be turned on and off instantly. It also allows the operating system to continue performing background tasks, such as updating content from apps, when a device is not being used. Devices must be able to turn on in less than 500 milliseconds. The hardware requirements extend to battery life, in that systems must not drain more than 5% of battery capacity while idle over a 16-hour period.

It requires the following:
 A firmware flag indicating support for the standard
 The boot volume must not use a hard disk drive
 Support for NDIS 6.30 by all network devices
 Passive cooling on standby
 Trusted Platform Module 2.0

There are additional security-specific requirements, for example for memory to be soldered to the motherboard to prevent cold boot attack vectors that involve removing memory from the machine , as well as support for Secure Boot.

On Windows 8.1, supporting InstantGo and having a Trusted Platform Module (TPM) 2.0 chip will allow the device to use a passive device encryption system.

Compliant platforms also enables full BitLocker Device encryption. A background service that encrypts the whole system which can be found in 'Settings'>'Device'>'About' page in Windows 10.

Limitations

Systems that support this specification are incapable of booting legacy BIOS operating systems. PCs with Modern Standby also cannot manually enter the Sleep power state and OEMs will often block S3 and S4 power states at the firmware level.

Issues
Microsoft's Modern Standby has experienced bugs that cause battery drain issues while the laptop is supposedly suspended. This has prevented some reviewers from recommending Windows laptops.

See also
 Advanced Configuration and Power Interface (ACPI)
 Always On, Always Connected
 Trusted Computing Group (TCG)
 Unified Extensible Firmware Interface (UEFI)

References

Further reading 
 
 
 

BIOS
Windows 8